Clube Desportivo Sete de Setembro, or Sete de Dourados, as they are usually called, is a Brazilian football team from Dourados in Mato Grosso do Sul, founded on 7 September 1994.

Sete de Dourados is currently ranked sixth among Mato Grosso do Sul teams in CBF's national club ranking, at 216th place overall.

History
The club was founded in 1994 but only made its first professional game in 2005, which was the year that the Sete de Dourados won the title of Campeonato Sul-Mato-Grossense Second Division.

In 2016, the club won in an unprecedented way the main division of Campeonato Sul-Mato-Grossense.

Stadium

Sete de Dourados play their home games at Douradão. The stadium has a maximum capacity of 30,000 people.

Honours
 Campeonato Sul-Mato-Grossense: 1
2016

 Campeonato Sul-Mato-Grossense Second Division: 1
2005

References

External links
 Sete de Dourados in Globo Esporte

 
Association football clubs established in 1994
Football clubs in Mato Grosso do Sul
1994 establishments in Brazil